Devaki Nandan Khatri (18 June 1861– 1 August 1913) was an Indian writer who lived in Varanasi and wrote the historic fiction fantasy novel Chandrakanta.

Biography 
He was born on 18 June 1861 in a Punjabi family in Pusa village of Muzaffarpur district of Bengal Presidency, British India (present day Bihar, India). His father's name was Lala Ishwardas. His forefathers were residents of Punjab (Lahore) and held high positions during the reign of the Mughals. Lala Ishwardas settled in Benaras during the reign of Sher Singh, son of Maharaj Ranjit Singh.

Khatri's early education was in Urdu-Persian. Later he also studied Hindi, Sanskrit and English. After finishing his early education, he reached Tekari Raj in Gaya and got a job with the king there. Later, he established a printing press called 'Lahari Press' in Varanasi and started the publication of Hindi monthly Sudarshan in 1900.

He died on 1 August 1913.

Works 

 Chandrakanta (1888 – 1892)
 Chandrakanta Santati
 Bhootnath
 Kajar ki Kothari
 Narendra-Mohini
 Kusum Kumari
 Birendra Veer
 Gupt Godna

References

External links
 Complete Chandrakanta at Gadya Kosh
 Chandrakanta at columbia.edu

Hindi-language writers
1861 births
19th-century Indian novelists
1913 deaths
Writers from Varanasi
Novelists from Uttar Pradesh
20th-century Indian novelists
Indian male novelists
20th-century Indian male writers